Pola Alonso (16 November 1923 – 6 November 2004 Buenos Aires) was a classic Argentine film actress of the 1940s and 1950s.

She appeared in the 1942 film Adolescencia and in 1955's Adiós muchachos. 

She was the sister of Argentine actor Tito Alonso.

Filmography
1942: Adolescencia
1942: Spring Bride
1947: Los Hijos del otro
1947: Un ángel sin pantalones
1948: María de los Ángeles
1948: Beatriz
1948: Recuerdos de un ángel
1948: Mis cinco hijos
1949: Almafuerte
1949: El ídolo del tango
1950: Hoy canto para ti
1954: Yo soy el criminal
1955: What Happened at Reynoso'-
1955: Adiós muchachos (film)1962: Una jaula no tiene secretos1963: La murga''

External links
 

1923 births
2004 deaths
People from Buenos Aires
Argentine film actresses
20th-century Argentine actresses
Burials at La Chacarita Cemetery